Amit Kumar Mandal is an Indian politician. He is a Member of Legislative Assembly and represents Godda (Vidhan Sabha constituency) of Jharkhand being a Bharatiya Janata Party candidate.

References

See also

Jharkhand Legislative Assembly

Living people
Jharkhand politicians
Bharatiya Janata Party politicians from Jharkhand
Members of the Jharkhand Legislative Assembly
Year of birth missing (living people)